Yevgeniy Apanasovich (born 18 July 2002) is a Belarusian professional footballer who plays for Maxline on loan from Slutsk.

References

External links 
 
 

2002 births
Living people
People from Luninets District
Sportspeople from Brest Region
Belarusian footballers
Association football forwards
FC Slutsk players
FC Lokomotiv Gomel players
FC Dnepr Rogachev players